Filago prolifera is a species of flowering plant in the family Asteraceae. It is native to northern Africa and the Arabian peninsula.

References

Gnaphalieae